Neurocalyx is a plant genus in the coffee family Rubiaceae. Species are found in southern India and Sri Lanka.

Species
The Plant List and the World Checklist of Selected Plant Families recognise 5 accepted species:
 Neurocalyx bremeri  
 Neurocalyx calycinus  
 Neurocalyx championii  
 Neurocalyx gardneri  
 Neurocalyx zeylanicus

References

Ophiorrhizeae
Rubiaceae genera